Vastseliina Castle (Russian: Novgorodok) was a castle of the Livonian Order, Bishopric of Dorpat. It was constructed by 1342 by the Landmeister Burkhard von Dreileben as part of the border fortifications of Old Livonia against Novgorod, Pskov and later Moscow.

Nowadays the ruins of the castle are located near Vastseliina (in Vana-Vastseliina village), Võru Parish, Võru County, Estonia.

See also
 History of Estonia
 List of castles in Estonia

References

External links
 Vastseliina Castle
 The Association of Castles and Museums around the Baltic Sea

Võru Parish
Castles in Estonia
Castles of the Livonian Order
Buildings and structures in Võru County
Ruined castles in Estonia
Tourist attractions in Võru County
Kreis Werro